Pleasant Hope High School is a public high school located in Pleasant Hope, Missouri, USA, a small town about 23 miles north of Springfield, Missouri. The school has roughly 250 students, and is the only high school in the Pleasant Hope R-6 School District, which also provides on-site high school educational services to Good Samaritan Boys Ranch, a residential treatment center in nearby Brighton.

References

Public high schools in Missouri
Schools in Polk County, Missouri